Oleksandr Mykhaylovych Kosyrin (born 18 June 1977) is a former professional footballer a former member of the Ukraine national team.

Career

Club career
Kosyrin started playing in his home town of Zaporizhia, at the football academy of FC Torpedo Zaporizhia. He spent two seasons playing in the Ukrainian Second League with Victor Zaporizhia. In 1995, he was brought back to Torpedo Zaporizhia, and after two seasons was sold to the Ukrainian giants FC Dynamo Kyiv. He only managed a handful of appearances for the senior team, spending most of his time playing for FC Dynamo-3 Kyiv and FC Dynamo-2 Kyiv, the club's reserve teams which compete in the Ukrainian Second League and Ukrainian First League respectively. In 1998, he was loaned out to FC Cherkasy, and had a good season there, scoring 11 goals in 18 league games. Kosyrin also spent a year playing in Israel with Maccabi Tel Aviv. He also spent two years with FC Arsenal Kyiv. In 2002, he was sold to the newly promoted FC Chornomorets Odessa, where he finally established himself as a formidable player. Kosyrin had a good three-year spell with the team, becoming the league leading scorer in the 2004–05 season. He formed a strong partnership with Kostantyn Balabanov. In 2005, he was sold to FC Metalurh Donetsk where he continued his good scoring form. On 19 June 2008 he made his return to Odessa by signing a two-year contract with Chornomorets. In the summer of 2010, when his contract expired, he joined FC Dniester Ovidiopol in the Ukrainian First League.

International career
Kosyrin has played for the Ukraine national under-21 football team on 6 occasions and has played for the Ukraine national team 7 times. His senior debut came on 15 August 2005 in the game against Macedonia.

References

External links
 Profile at FC Chornomorets Odessa 
 Profile at Odessa Football 
 
 
 
 

1977 births
Living people
Ukrainian footballers
Ukrainian expatriate footballers
Ukraine international footballers
Ukraine under-21 international footballers
FC Viktor Zaporizhzhia players
FC Metalurh Donetsk players
FC Torpedo Zaporizhzhia players
FC Chornomorets Odesa players
Maccabi Tel Aviv F.C. players
FC Dnister Ovidiopol players
FC Dynamo Kyiv players
FC Dynamo-2 Kyiv players
FC Dynamo-3 Kyiv players
FC CSKA Kyiv players
FC CSKA-2 Kyiv players
FC Arsenal Kyiv players
FC Dnipro Cherkasy players
FC Hoverla Uzhhorod players
FC Balkany Zorya players
Ukrainian Premier League players
Ukrainian First League players
Ukrainian Second League players
Ukrainian Amateur Football Championship players
Expatriate footballers in Israel
Ukrainian expatriate sportspeople in Israel
Footballers from Zaporizhzhia
Ukrainian Premier League top scorers
Association football forwards
Ukrainian Cup top scorers